Anna-Karin Eriksson (born 16 April 1967) is a Swedish swimmer. She competed in two events at the 1984 Summer Olympics.

References

External links
 

1967 births
Living people
Swedish female backstroke swimmers
Olympic swimmers of Sweden
Swimmers at the 1984 Summer Olympics
People from Kalix Municipality
Sportspeople from Norrbotten County